Non-Intentional Lifeform or simply N.I.L. were an Australian band formed in 1995 and signed to Roadrunner Records. They had a minor Australian hit with their single "Living or Existing?", which appeared in the popular Australian television series Good Guys Bad Guys, among others. A video of 'Six O'clock Headshot' from Air Left Vacant appeared on Roadrunner Records 'Drilling The Vein' compilation video in 1996. Their album, Uisce, was released in 1997, and the band toured with Korn, Marilyn Manson, Kiss, Helmet, Dubwar, Grinspoon and Superheist, as well as playing shows with The Prodigy, Deftones, The Living End, Fear Factory, The Mark of Cain, Cosmic Psychos, The Avalanches, Shihad and Bodyjar. The band split up in 1998.

Members
Declan de Barra - vocals
Andrew Day - guitar, vocals, trombone, mandolin, didgeridoo
Hywel Stoakes - bass 
Adam Pedretti - drums

After split
After split, Adam Pedretti later joined Killing Heidi. Declan de Barra played briefly with a completely new line-up and they released a single "Pathogen" before folding. De Barra then formed Clann Zu. Andrew Day went on to found the electronic project Nightswimmer and then the London U.K based post-punk band The Sound Movement whose first album was released on Oxford label Truck Records.

Discography

Albums
 Close Your Eyes and See What God Will Take From You (1995)
 Uisce (1997)

EPs
 Air Left Vacant (1996) 
 Pathogen (1998)

Singles
 "Living or Existing?" (1997)
 "Sample of Semen" (1997)

See also
Lifeform (disambiguation)

External links
 Non-Intentional Lifeform at bandcamp.com
 Australian Television Soundtracks - Good Guys Bad Guys
 Bubblehead Music Interview
 Non Intentional Lifeform at rateyourmusic.com

Australian hard rock musical groups